The Fortinet Championship, previously the Safeway Open, is a professional golf tournament, part of the PGA Tour. Originally sponsored by Fry's Electronics, it was first staged in 2007 as the Fry's Electronics Open at Grayhawk Golf Club's Raptor Course in Scottsdale, Arizona. It was renamed to the Frys.com Open in 2008 and moved to California in 2010, to CordeValle Golf Club in San Martin, southeast of San Jose. In October 2014, part of the PGA Tour's 2015 season, it moved north to Napa and the Silverado Country Club  

Beginning with the October 2016 tournament, part of the PGA Tour's 2017 season, the primary sponsor was Safeway Inc., and that continued through 2020. In 2021 Fortinet became the title sponsor on a six-year deal.

History 
Silverado's North Course hosted an annual event on the PGA Tour from 1968 through 1980, the first nine editions as the Kaiser International Open Invitational. In 1977, that event was renamed the Anheuser-Busch Golf Classic and in 1981 it moved east to Kingsmill in Williamsburg, Virginia, where it was played through 2002.

The Frys.com Open began as a PGA Tour Fall Series event, from 2007 through 2012. Starting in October 2013, when the PGA Tour changed its "year" to begin in October, rather than January, the tournament became the opening event of the PGA Tour season, and FedEx Cup points were awarded to players.

The inaugural event in 2007, at Grayhawk Golf Club's Raptor Course in Scottsdale, Arizona, was won by Mike Weir by one stroke over Mark Hensby. The 2008 event was won by Cameron Beckman on the second playoff hole, when Kevin Sutherland bogeyed it. In 2009, Troy Matteson set a PGA Tour 36-hole record of 122 with 61 in both the second and third rounds, and then won in a three-man playoff against Rickie Fowler and Jamie Lovemark. At CordeValle in San Martin in 2012, John Mallinger shot a 62, matching the course record; it was his PGA Tour best round.

In 2013, tournament organizers had a long-term goal to stage the event at The Institute Golf Course in Morgan Hill, a course owned by  when facilities were completed there. That was expected in 2016 or 2017, but did not happen because of the change of sponsorship to Safeway in 2016.

Winners

Note: Green highlight indicates scoring records.

References

External links

Coverage on the PGA Tour's official site

PGA Tour events
Golf in California
Golf in Arizona
Sports in the San Francisco Bay Area
Sports competitions in Scottsdale, Arizona
Recurring sporting events established in 2007
2007 establishments in Arizona
October sporting events